The Set Decorators Society of America Award for Best Achievement in Decor/Design of a Period Feature Film is an annual award given by the Set Decorators Society of America. It honors the work set decorators whose work has been deemed the "best" of a given year, in the genres of comedy and/or musical film. It was first awarded in 2021.

Winners and nominees

2020s

References

External links
 

2021 film awards
2021 in American cinema